The 9th Army Corps was an Army corps in the Imperial Russian Army.

Composition
5th Infantry Division
42nd Infantry Division
9th Cavalry Division

Part of
3rd Army: 1914–1916
4th Army: 1916
3rd Army: 1916
4th Army: 1916
2nd Army: 1916–1917

Commanders
1877–1878: Nikolay Kridener
1878–1886: Arkady Dmitrievich Stolypin
1912–1915: Dmitry Shcherbachev
1915–1916: Abram Dragomirov
1916-April 1917 :  Nikolay Kiselevsky
May–September 1917: Pyotr Telezhnikov
September-November 1917: Andrey Snesarev

Corps of the Russian Empire
Military units and formations established in 1876
Military units and formations disestablished in 1918
1876 establishments in the Russian Empire